Multekrem is a traditional Norwegian dessert made by mixing cloudberries with whipped cream and sugar.

The cloudberries can be served as-is or heated.

References

See also
 List of Norwegian desserts
 List of desserts
 

Norwegian desserts
Fruit dishes